Zakrzówek may refer to the following places in Poland:
Zakrzówek, part of the Dębniki district of Kraków
Zakrzówek, Lublin Voivodeship (east Poland)
Zakrzówek, Garwolin County in Masovian Voivodeship (east-central Poland)
Zakrzówek, Zwoleń County in Masovian Voivodeship (east-central Poland)
Zakrzówek, Świętokrzyskie Voivodeship (south-central Poland)
Gmina Zakrzówek, a rural municipality in Kraśnik County, Lublin Voivodeship